The 2021–22 P. League+ season was the 2nd season of the P. League+ (PLG). The P. League+ added two new teams, New Taipei Kings and Kaohsiung Steelers, extended the number of teams to 6. The regular season began on December 12, 2021, and is originally scheduled to end on May 15, 2022. The playoffs started on June 3, 2022 and ended on June 27, 2022 after the Taipei Fubon Braves clinched their second consecutive champion.

Transactions

Retirement
 On March 15, 2021, Tien Lei announced his retirement from professional basketball.
 On July 8, 2021, LaDontae Henton joined Providence Friars as a special assistant to the head coach, ending his playing career.
 On September 23, 2021, Lai Kuo-Wei joined New Taipei CTBC DEA as assistant coach, ending his playing career.

Coaching changes

Off-season
 On June 7, 2021, the New Taipei Kings hired Ryan Marchand as their new head coach.
 On June 11, 2021, the Kaohsiung Steelers hired DeMarcus Berry as their new head coach.
 On July 12, 2021, the Taoyuan Pilots hired Cheng Chih-Lung as their new head coach.
 On September 28, 2021, Taoyuan Pilots intermin head coach Yang I-Feng was assigned to assistant coach and player development director.

In-season
 On March 19, 2022, the Kaohsiung Steelers fired head coach DeMarcus Berry and named Hung Chi-Chao as their interim head coach.
 On March 23, 2022, Cheng Chih-Lung resigned from his position as head coach of the Taoyuan Pilots after 16 games with the team. On March 25, 2022, the Pilots named Yen Hsing-Su as their interim head coach.

Imports / Foreign Student / Heritage Player

Note 1: Heritage player refers to player of Taiwanese descent but does not met the FIBA eligibility rules to be local. 

Note 2: Team can either register 2 heritage players or 1 foreign student and 1 heritage player.

Preseason
The preseason began on November 6, 2021, and ended on November 21.

Regular season
The regular season began on December 12, 2021, and ended on May 28, 2022.

Notes
 z – Clinched home court advantage for the entire playoffs
 x – Clinched playoff spot

Postponed games due to COVID-19
 Three Taoyuan Pilots home games (against the New Taipei Kings on February 11, against the Hsinchu JKO Lioneers on February 19, and against the Formosa Taishin Dreamers on February 20) were postponed due to a COVID outbreak in Taoyuan City.
 The May 7 game between the Taoyuan Pilots and the Kaohsiung Steelers was postponed due to the Steelers not having the required minimum players (7 locals and 1 import) available.
 Two New Taipei Kings games (one home game against the Formosa Taishin Dreamers on May 6 and one road game against Taipei Fubon Braves on May 8) were postponed due to the Kings not having the required minimum players (7 locals and 1 import) available.
 The May 7 game between the Taipei Fubon Braves and the Hsinchu JKO Lioneers was postponed due to Lioneers staffs testing positive for COVID-19 rapid test.
 The May 8 game between the Taoyuan Pilots and the Formosa Taishin Dreamers was postponed due to Pilots players testing positive for COVID-19 rapid test.
 The May 16 game between the Taoyuan Pilots and the Kaohsiung Steelers was postponed due to the Steelers not having the required minimum players (8 players) available.
 Two Formosa Taishin Dreamers road games (one game against the Taoyuan Pilots on May 17 and one game against New Taipei Kings on May 19) were postponed due to the Dreamers not having the required minimum players (8 players) available.

Postponed games due to other reasons
 The February 26 game between the Formosa Taishin Dreamers and the Hsinchu JKO Lioneers was postponed due to the 2023 FIBA Basketball World Cup qualification.
 Two New Taipei Kings home games (against the Kaohsiung Steelers on February 27 and against the Hsinchu JKO Lioneers on February 28) were postponed due to the 2023 FIBA Basketball World Cup qualification.
 Two Taipei Fubon Braves home games (against the Taoyuan Pilots on February 27 and against the Formosa Taishin Dreamers on February 28) were postponed due to the 2023 FIBA Basketball World Cup qualification.

Cancelled games
 On May 29 ,the Taoyuan Pilots and the Kaohsiung Steelers had reached an agreement that the last game between both teams, which would affect neither the playoffs seeding nor the 2022 draft order, would not be played due to the Steelers could not reach the criteria of required minimum players (8 players) before June 1.

Playoffs

Bracket

Bold Series winner
Italic Team with home-court advantage

Statistics

Individual statistic leaders

Individual game highs

Team statistic leaders

Awards

Yearly awards

All-PLG First Team:
 Yang Chin-Min, New Taipei Kings
 Lee Kai-Yan, New Taipei Kings
 Sim Bhullar, Hsinchu JKO Lioneers
 Chen Yu-Wei, Kaohsiung Steelers
 Lu Cheng-Ju, Kaohsiung Steelers

All-PLG Second Team:
 Lin Chih-Chieh, Taipei Fubon Braves
 Thomas Welsh, New Taipei Kings
 Lu Chun-Hsiang, Taoyuan Pilots
 Kao Kuo-Hao, Hsinchu JKO Lioneers
 Kenneth Chien, Formosa Taishin Dreamers

All-Defensive Team:
 Lee Kai-Yan, New Taipei Kings
 Thomas Welsh, New Taipei Kings
 Kao Kuo-Hao, Hsinchu JKO Lioneers
 Kenneth Chien, Formosa Taishin Dreamers
 Chen Yu-Wei, Kaohsiung Steelers

Statistical awards

Finals

Players of the Week

Preseason

Regular season

Players of the Month

Arenas
 The Kaohsiung Steelers announced on May 25, 2021, that they would play their home games at Fengshan Arena.
 The New Taipei Kings announced on September 4, that they would play their home games at Xinzhuang Gymnasium, and would share the same arena with New Taipei CTBC DEA of T1 League.
 Due to the renovation of Changhua County Stadium, the Formosa Taishin Dreamers announced on July 7, 2021, that they would play their home games at Intercontinental Basketball Stadium in Taichung City this season.
 The Taoyuan Pilots scheduled first two of their home games at National Taiwan Sport University Arena.
 The Taoyuan Pilots relocated last two of their rescheduled home games to Nanshan High School Gymnasium in New Taipei City, despite the latter one was cancelled on May 29.

Media
The games will be aired on television via FTV One and MOMOTV, and will be broadcast online on YouTube Official Channel, 4gTV, and Yahoo! Sports.

References

External links
 

 
Basketball events postponed due to the COVID-19 pandemic